The 2021 Men's League1 Ontario season was the seventh season of play (the 2020 season was cancelled due to the COVID-19 pandemic) for League1 Ontario, a Division 3 men's soccer league in the Canadian soccer pyramid and the highest level of soccer based in the Canadian province of Ontario.

Impact of COVID-19
After the 2020 League1 Ontario season was cancelled, due to the COVID-19 pandemic, the league was optimistic that the 2021 season would be able to proceed. The league initially announced a projected start date of July 2, 2021, also announcing a 'drop-dead date' of June 7, 2021 that will confirm the start of the season on that date depending on restrictions in the province, otherwise the season would be cancelled. In mid-June, the league start date was later revised to July 29, 2021, in accordance with the local re-opening plans.

Format 
The league was divided into two divisions with the East Division having seven teams and the West division having eight teams. Each team played 12 games against teams in their own divisions (East played each opponent home and away, while West played five of the teams twice, and the remaining two teams once). The top two teams from each division advanced to the playoff semi-finals, with the winner of the championship final in November qualifying for the 2022 Canadian Championship.

Because the season began three months later than normal and with very short notice, some clubs have opted to delay their return to Premier Division competition until the 2022 season. As a large portion of the L1O player pool consisted of university and college student athletes, some sides would have limited squads after Labour Day. To combat these challenges, the league created a short-season ‘Summer Championship Series’ for 2021, which will conclude by Labour Day.

In addition, the Reserve Division will return, following a similar format to the Premier Division, featuring 21 teams in three division playing 12 matches, with the top teams advancing to the playoffs and featuring Championship Finals weekend on November 6-7.

Clubs
The men's division consists of 21 teams, an increase from 17 teams in 2020. 1812 FC Barrie, Guelph United F.C., Scrosoppi FC, St. Catharines Roma Wolves, and Waterloo United are new entries, while Aurora FC will not be returning. Hamilton United, who joined in 2020, will also be debuting after their inaugural season was cancelled due to the pandemic. However, some teams opted out of the main division due to the delayed start, resulting in only 15 teams participating. Some of these clubs will still operate teams in the short-season Summer Championship or full length Reserve Division.

The following clubs are set to participate in the league.

The following clubs, while not formally part of League1 Ontario are operating teams in the Summer Championship or Reserve Divisions:

Premier Division

East Division

West Division

Playoffs

Semifinals

Final

Statistics

Top goalscorers 

Updated to matches played on October 28, 2021. Source:

Top goalkeepers 

Updated to matches played on October 28, 2021.  Minimum 450 minutes played. Source:

Honours
The following awards and nominations were awarded for the 2021 season.

Awards

East Division

West Division

League All-Stars

East Division

West Division

Summer Championship Division
Due to the delayed start to the season, some teams were unable to commit to the full season for the Premier Division. For 2021, a short season "Summer Championship" (also called the 'University' Division) was created which will conclude by Labour Day and will include some of the teams that could not participate in the full season.

Reserve Division

East Division

Central Division

West Division

Playoffs

Semi-finals

Final

References

External links 

League1 Ontario
League1 Ontario seasons